The 1955 Italian presidential election was held in Italy on 28–29 April 1955. Giovanni Gronchi, President of the Chamber of Deputies, was elected President of Italy

Only members of Parliament and regional delegates were entitled to vote, most of these electors having been elected in the 1953 general election.

Procedure
In accordance with the Italian Constitution, the election was held in the form of a secret ballot, with the Senators and the Deputies entitled to vote. The election was held in the Palazzo Montecitorio, home of the Chamber of Deputies, with the capacity of the building expanded for the purpose. The first three ballots required a two-thirds majority of the 843 voters in order to elect a president, or 562 votes. Starting from the fourth ballot, an absolute majority was required for candidates to be elected, or 422 votes.

The election was presided over by the President of the Chamber of Deputies Giovanni Gronchi, who proceeded to the public counting of the votes, and by the President of the Senate Cesare Merzagora.

Proposed nominees
 Ferruccio Parri, former Prime Minister, was proposed by the Republican Party and sustained by left-wing parties;
 Cesare Merzagora, incumbent President of the Senate, was the first proposal of Christian Democrat leader Amintore Fanfani; his proposal was subsequently withdrawn after the leftist internal faction of the party did not vote for him;
 Giovanni Gronchi, incumbent President of the Chamber of Deputies, was initially voted by left-wing DC internal faction and by some left-wing representatives; he obtained a larger consent only on the fourth round of voting;
 Luigi Einaudi, outgoing President, was proposed for a second mandate by the Liberal Party.

Chronology
On 28 April 1955, the Italian Parliament convened to elect the new President of the Republic, since President Luigi Einaudi's term was about to end. After the death of Alcide De Gasperi, the new leader of Christian Democracy party Amintore Fanfani decided to endorse the candidacy of the incumbent President of the Senate Cesare Merzagora, but failed to control his own party's representatives, who on the first ballot succeeded in making Merzagora's candidacy sink.

On the first round, left-wing parties decided to sustain the actionist Ferruccio Parri, while liberals and monarchists decided to vote for the outgoing President Luigi Einaudi.

After Merzagora's candidacy failed to gain a large majority, Fanfani decided to endorse the incumbent President of the Chamber of Deputies Giovanni Gronchi. As a member of the leftist faction of the Christian Democracy, Gronchi was able to gain the support of left-wing parties. On 29 April 1955 on the fourth-round vote, Gronchi was elected the new President of Italian Republic by a large margin.

Results

Inauguration
Giovanni Gronchi officially sworn in as the new President of Italy on 11 May 1955.

Gallery

Notes

References

Presidential elections in Italy
1955 elections in Italy